Kathleen Louise Wolf (née Munsterman; July 9, 1925 – May 26, 2020) was an American politician.

Personal life
Wolf was born to parents John and Helen Munsterman on July 9, 1925, in Wolcott, Indiana, and raised on the family farm. Her father was a Republican precinct committee member. She graduated from Wolcott High School in 1943 and earned a degree from Indiana Business College and also enrolled at Purdue University. She married Charlie Wolf in 1945. The couple lived in Reynolds, then moved to Monticello in 1978. Charlie Wolf died in 2010. Katie Wolf died on May 26, 2020, at the White Oak Health Campus in Monticello.

Political career
Wolf was elected a member of the Democratic National Committee in 1962. In December 1967, she was appointed White County clerk, a position she subsequently held for two full terms in her own right. Wolf served one term as a member of the Indiana House of Representatives from 1984 to 1986, then was elected to consecutive terms in the Indiana Senate until her retirement in 2000.

References

External links

1925 births
2020 deaths
Democratic Party Indiana state senators
Democratic Party members of the Indiana House of Representatives
Women state legislators in Indiana
20th-century American women politicians
20th-century American politicians
People from Monticello, Indiana
Harrison College (Indiana)
Purdue University alumni
County clerks in Indiana
21st-century American women